Stigmella apicialbella is a moth of the family Nepticulidae. It is found in Kentucky and Ohio of the United States.

The wingspan is 3.6-4.8 mm. Late instar larvae can be found in mid-June, late July, August and September. Adults have been collected from late April to mid-May and early July through to August. There are three generations per year.

The larvae feed on Ulmus fulva, Ulmus americana and Ulmus thomasii. They mine the leaves of their host plant.  The mine is long and linear and located on the upper surface. It increases gradually in width. The colour is pale brown with a conspicuous dark line of frass deposited centrally.

External links
Nepticulidae of North America
A taxonomic revision of the North American species of Stigmella (Lepidoptera: Nepticulidae)

Nepticulidae
Moths of North America
Moths described in 1873